Mount Anville Secondary School is a Roman Catholic, voluntary all-girls post-primary school in Goatstown, a suburb of Dublin, in Ireland. It was originally an all-boarding school, but due to decreased demand for such schools has since become a day school. It has approximately 659 students, and is attached to Mount Anville Montessori Junior School and Mount Anville Convent.

It was established in 1853 by nuns of the Society of the Sacred Heart in the former home of William Dargan, an influential railway tycoon. Mount Anville was once situated in north Dublin.

Grounds
The school has its own chapel, featuring a stained-glass window by Irish artist Harry Clarke. The school also has sporting facilities, including a large sports hall, three astroturf playing pitches and tennis courts.

Notable alumnae

 Lisa Cannon, television presenter
 Caroline Casey, social entrepreneur
 Catherine Day, secretary general of the European Commission
 Alison Doody, actress
 Sheila Humphreys, political activist
 Kathleen MacMahon, journalist and novelist
 Emma Madigan, current Ambassador of Ireland to the Holy See
 Josepha Madigan, Irish politician, Minister for Culture, Heritage and the Gaeltacht
 Sybil Mulcahy, journalist
 Samantha Power, 28th US Ambassador to the United Nations (attended Mount Anville Montessori)
 Mary Robinson, the 7th (and first female) President of Ireland, United Nations High Commissioner for Human Rights (1997–2002)
 Veronica Ryan, founder of the first Irish Montessori school

See also
List of Schools of the Sacred Heart

References

External links
Mount Anville Website
Network of Sacred Heart Schools

Girls' schools in the Republic of Ireland
Secondary schools in Dún Laoghaire–Rathdown
Private schools in the Republic of Ireland
Catholic secondary schools in the Republic of Ireland
Sacred Heart schools
1853 establishments in Ireland
Educational institutions established in 1853